Nandita Roy (born April 3, 1955) is an Indian filmmaker and screenwriter. She made her directorial debut with the film Icche (2011) along with her co-director Shiboprosad Mukherjee. The two have also directed Accident, Muktodhara, Alik Sukh, Ramdhanu, Bela Seshe, Haami, Praktan , Posto (film), Konntho, Gotro. She has been a part of several projects and has worked with many renowned directors.

Early life
Nandita Roy was born on April 3, 1955 in Mumbai. She attended high school at St. Joseph's Convent High School in the suburb of Vile Parle, and is an economics graduate of Parle College. She began work as a primary schoolteacher in St. Joseph's Convent. She later studied for her postgrad in economics from University of Mumbai, Kalina. She married Nitish Roy in 1977. Currently she lives in Kolkata, India with her family.

Career

Roy began her professional career in 1978, as a glove-puppet operator and co-director on Agadoom-Bagadoom, a short puppet film for children. Through the 1980s and 1990s, Roy built up a broad resume in various films, working as an assistant editor, assistant director, set dresser, research assistant, and scriptwriter, learning many sides of the business.

Roy moved to television and became responsible for ETV Network's first nonfiction and fiction production house, and was the creative and administrative manager of their Bengali-language channel.  She created 19 original nonfiction programs for the network, including the first Bengali women's magazine program, Sreemoti. Roy also started a series of one-hour television films by well-known directors.

Roy started Windows Productions with Shiboprosad Mukherjee.
Together they produced programs for many channels:

Tara Bangla – Benudir Ranna Ghar, Ki Chai Aaj Ke Taka Na Sona
Zee Bangla – Naari, Kaane Kaane, Ilish E Parbon, Oder Bolte Dao, Shanai, Bangla Bolche, Cadre No. 1
E-TV Bangla – Ritur Mela Jhoom Tara Ra Ra, Aajker Mushkil Assan, Pujor Caravan, Pochishe Baisakh (Anondo Dhwani Jagao Gagane), Modhukar Manjiro Baje, Chandalika (dance drama), Shyama (dance drama), Shapmochan (dance drama), Mayar Khela (dance drama), Mahanayika (live event), Megastar, Saath pake bandha, Ebong Rituporno, Jobab chai jobab dao, Saaf Kotha, Janata Express, Barishaler Bor Kolkatar kone, Prothoma
E-TV Bihar, UP, MP, Rajasthan – Koi Kisise Kam Nahin, Galiyon Ka Raja
Aakash Bangla – Swarga Live, Siddhel Chor, Kailash Prem, Swapno Sundari
Tara Muzik – Anjali, Gitanjali, Gitobitan, Ganer Tori, Cholti Haoa, World of DJs, Dhitang Dhitang Bole, Cinemar Gaan
N-TV (Bangladesh) – Ke Korbe Baaji Maat
Channel–I (Bangladesh) – Modhukar Manjiro Baje, music videos
24 Ghanta – Aajker Naari
Doordarshan Kendra–Kolkata – Bouma, Dakbabu
Rupashi Bangla – Dance pe chance (season 1 and 2)

Filmography as director and screenplay writer

Praktan was the highest-grossing Bengali film of 2016 and swept the West Bengal Film Journalist Awards including Most Popular Film. Bela Seshe and Icche also had highly-successful theatrical runs of 250 and 125 days, respectively. Many of her films met with critical acclaim. Icche was screened at the Indian Panorama Film Festival, Accident was selected for the International Film Festival of Kerala, and Alik Sukh premiered at the Cannes Film Festival. The National Film Archive of India accepted Icche as part of their collection for cultural and educational purposes. Icche, Muktodhara and Ramdhanu were included in the BEd curriculum of Visva-Bharati University. Icche and Muktodhara have also been used by the Certificate Course on Legal and Psychological Counselling for Women in Distress.

Awards
 Anandalok Award 2012 – Best Film for Muktodhara
 Filmfare Award (East) 2014 – Best Direction for the film Alik Sukh
 Indian Business Film Awards 2016 to Praktan

References

External links
 

1955 births
Living people
Bengali film directors
Indian women film directors
Indian women screenwriters
Film directors from Mumbai
University of Mumbai alumni
Women artists from Maharashtra
21st-century Indian film directors
21st-century Indian women artists
Screenwriters from Mumbai